is a Japanese fashion-model and actress best known for her comic book roles in film and TV and has appeared in projects such as the superhero film The Wolverine (2013) as Yukio, the TV series Arrow as Tatsu Yamashiro, and Ghost in the Shell (2017) as the Red-robed Geisha.

Life and career 
Rila Fukushima was born in Tokyo, Japan.

Originally attempting to secure a position as a model agent at a Tokyo agency, she was persuaded to try modeling instead. Her career has included work for numerous labels and brands in various shows and campaigns.

Fukushima also starred in the 2013 superhero film The Wolverine as Yukio, and appeared in the 2014 Taiga drama Gunshi Kanbei as Omichi.

Fukushima replaced Devon Aoki in the role of Tatsu Yamashiro for the third season of The CW television show Arrow. In 2015, she appeared in the HBO series Game of Thrones in a season 5 episode as a Red Priestess in Volantis. She starred in Million Yen Women as Minami Shirakawa on Netflix.

She was chosen as one of the women of 2013 by Vogue Japan.

Filmography

Films

TV series

References

External links

 

Living people
21st-century Japanese actresses
Japanese female models
Japanese film actresses
Japanese television actresses
Actresses from Tokyo
Year of birth missing (living people)
Models from Tokyo Metropolis